Béal an Daingin or Béal a' Daingin (anglicized as Bealadangan) is a small Gaeltacht village in Connemara (Conamara), County Galway, Ireland. The primary spoken language is Irish, and all but a few of the elderly population also speak English.  There is a pub, a post office and a primary school (Toureen) within a few miles of the village.  

Local traditions include the continued cutting of turf (peat) for use in heating homes. Sean-nós singing is still performed locally. Raidió na Gaeltachta is the local Irish-language radio station and some local singers and musicians can be heard on the station.

The name of the village derives from the Irish béal an daingin meaning the mouth of the stronghold.

Other nearby villages are Leitir Móir and An Cheathrú Rua.

Notable people
 Diarmuid Mac an Adhastair (1944-2015), actor who portrayed the character Seamus Mhicil Tom on the TV drama, Ros na Rún.

See also
 List of towns and villages in Ireland

References

Towns and villages in County Galway
Gaeltacht places in County Galway